Marius Vasile Cozmiuc (born 7 September 1992) is a Romanian rower. A 2022 World Champion in the coxless pair, Cozmiuc competed in a coxless four at the 2016 Summer Olympics and won a silver medal in the coxless pair at Tokyo 2020. He married fellow Olympic rower Ionela-Livia Cozmiuc in 2017.

References

External links

1992 births
Living people
Romanian male rowers
Olympic rowers of Romania
Rowers at the 2012 Summer Olympics
Rowers at the 2016 Summer Olympics
Rowers at the 2020 Summer Olympics
Medalists at the 2020 Summer Olympics
Olympic silver medalists for Romania
Olympic medalists in rowing
Sportspeople from Suceava
World Rowing Championships medalists for Romania
21st-century Romanian people